Hanoï is the sixth live album by French new wave band Indochine. It was released in February 2007. It is a recording of a performance that took place on 6 June 2006. The album takes its name from the location of the concert, Hanoi, Vietnam.

Track listing
Disc 1 - Hanoï Classique
 Le Péril Jaune - 3:30
 Ceremonia - 4:39
 Salômbo - 3:51
 Justine - 4:24
 Trois Nuits Par Semaine - 6:23
 Sweet Dreams - 6:03
 Pink Water - 5:53
 J'Ai Demandé A La Lune - 4:21
 Tes Yeux Noirs - 5:05
 3e Sexe - 3:58
 L'Aventurier - 6:33
 Talulla - 4:21

Disc 2 - Hanoï Rock
 Les Portes Du Soir - 5:04
 Alice & June - 4:57
 Marilyn - 5:12
 Adora - 4:32
 Atomic Sky - 5:04
 Gang Bang - 4:05
 Lady Boy - 4:21
 Starlight - 5:10

References

External links
 Detailed album information at www.indo-chine.org

Indochine (band) albums
2007 live albums